John Malalas  ( – 578) was a Byzantine chronicler from Antioch (now Antakya, Turkey).

Life
Malalas was of Syrian descent, and he was a native speaker of Syriac who learned how to write in Greek later in his life. The name Malalas probably derived from the Aramaic word (ܡܰܠܳܠܰܐ malolo) for "rhetor", "orator"; it is first applied to him by John of Damascus. The alternative form Malelas is later, first appearing in Constantine VII.

Malalas was educated in Antioch, and probably was a jurist there, but moved to Constantinople at some point in Justinian I's reign (perhaps after the Persian sack of Antioch in 540); all we know of his travels from his own hand are visits to Thessalonica and Paneas.

Writing

He wrote a Chronographia in 18 books, the beginning and the end of which are lost. In its present state it begins with the mythical history of Egypt and ends with the expedition to Roman Africa under the tribune Marcianus, Justinian's nephew, in 563 (his editor Thurn believes it originally ended with Justinian's death); it is focused largely on Antioch and (in the later books) Constantinople. Except for the history of Justinian and his immediate predecessors, it possesses little historical value; the author, "relying on Eusebius of Caesarea and other compilers, confidently strung together myths, biblical stories, and real history." The eighteenth book, dealing with Justinian's reign, is well acquainted with, and colored by, official propaganda. The writer is a supporter of Church and State, an upholder of monarchical principles. (However, the theory identifying him with the patriarch John Scholasticus is almost certainly incorrect.)

He used several sources (for example Eustathius of Epiphania and other unknown authors).

The work is important as the first surviving example of a chronicle written not for the learned but for the instruction of the monks and the common people, and its language shows a compromise with the spoken language of the day, although "it is still very much a written style. In particular, he employs technical terminology and bureaucratic clichés incessantly, and, in a period of transition from Latin to Greek governmental terminology, still uses the Latin loanwords alongside their Greek replacements.... The overall impression created by Malálas' style is one of simplicity, reflecting a desire for the straightforward communication of information in the written language of everyday business as it had evolved under the influence of spoken Greek."

It obtained great popularity, and was used by various writers until the ninth century; it was translated into Old Bulgarian probably in the tenth century, and parts of it were used for the Old Russian Primary Chronicle. It is preserved in an abridged form in a single manuscript now at Oxford, as well as in various fragments. A medieval translation in Georgian also exists.

See also
 Philokalia
 Hesychasm

References

Citations

Sources

Modern editions 
 Text
 Johannes Thurn (ed.) 2000, Ioannis Malalae Chronographia, Corpus Fontium Historiae Byzantinae (CFHB) 35 (Berlin, New York: Walter de Gruyter) 

 Translation
 Elizabeth Jeffreys, Michael Jeffreys, Roger Scott et al. 1986, The Chronicle of John Malalas: A Translation, Byzantina Australiensia 4 (Melbourne: Australian Association for Byzantine Studies)

Further reading
 E. Jeffreys, B. Croke, and R. Scott (eds.), Studies in John Malalas (Sydney: Australian Association for Byzantine Studies, 1990) (Byzantina Australiensia, 6), pp. 1–25.
 David Woods, "Malalas, Constantius, and a Church-inscription from Antioch," Vigiliae Christianae, 59,1 (2005), pp. 54–62.
 J. H. W. G. Liebeschuetz, "Malalas on Antioch," in Idem, Decline and Change in Late Antiquity: Religion, Barbarians and their Historiography (Aldershot, Ashgate, 2006) (Variorum Collected Studies).

External links 
 Chronicle of John Malalas (full, translated)
Translation of the 8th book of Malalas' Chronographia
Greek Opera Omnia by Migne Patrologia Graeca with analytical indexes
Catholic Encyclopedia (1910 ed.), John Malalas"
Malalas, Chronography (online English translation, open access)

491 births
578 deaths
People from Antioch
6th-century Byzantine historians
Medieval Thessalonica
Historians of Justinian I